Rawcliffe (or Rawcliffe in Snaith) is a village and civil parish in the East Riding of Yorkshire, England. It lies on the banks of the River Aire just north of the M62 and on the A614 road. Rawcliffe, along with nearby Airmyn, was the location of one of the first reliable reports of the practice of warping in agriculture in the 1730s.

Overview

The civil parish is formed by the village of Rawcliffe and the hamlet of Rawcliffe Bridge which lies just to the south-east of the village.
According to the 2011 UK census, Rawcliffe parish had a population of 2,379, an increase on the 2001 UK census figure of 2,087.

The village is served by a railway station on the Pontefract Line railway, originally part of the Lancashire and Yorkshire Railway route to nearby Goole.

The parish was part of the Goole Rural District in the West Riding of Yorkshire from 1894 to 1974, then in Boothferry district of Humberside until 1996.

The parish church is dedicated to St James and was designated a Grade II listed building in 1986.

A  Local Nature Reserve, Sugar Mill Ponds, has been created on the site of an old sugar factory at Rawcliffe Bridge.

Gallery

References

Villages in the East Riding of Yorkshire
Civil parishes in the East Riding of Yorkshire
Local Nature Reserves in the East Riding of Yorkshire